Roope Samuel Suomalainen (born 6 September 1973 in Kotka) is a retired Finnish sailor, who specialized in the Laser class. He represented his nation Finland in two editions of the Olympic Games (2000 and 2004), and has also been training throughout most of his sporting career for Kotka Yacht Club in his native Kotka.

Suomalainen made his official debut at the 2000 Summer Olympics in Sydney, where he placed seventeenth in the Laser class with a net grade of 127, surpassing Hungary's Tamas Eszes by a single mark in total.

At the 2004 Summer Olympics in Athens, Suomalainen qualified for his second Finnish team, as a 30-year-old, in the Laser class by placing fourteenth and obtaining a berth from the 2003 ISAF World Championships in Cadiz, Spain. Unlike his previous Olympics, Suomalainen could not upgrade his feat with a nineteenth-place effort in a fleet of forty-two sailors, recording a net score of 160.

References

External links
 
 
 

1973 births
Living people
Finnish male sailors (sport)
Olympic sailors of Finland
Sailors at the 2000 Summer Olympics – Laser
Sailors at the 2004 Summer Olympics – Laser
People from Kotka
Sportspeople from Kymenlaakso